The Ministry of Environment, Forest and Climate Change (MoEFCC) is an Indian government ministry. This ministry is headed by Secretary Rank senior most IAS officer. The ministry portfolio is currently held by Bhupender Yadav, Union Minister of Environment, Forest and Climate Change.

The ministry is responsible for planning, promoting, coordinating, and overseeing the implementation of environmental and forestry programmes in the country. The main activities undertaken by the ministry include conservation and survey of the flora of India and fauna of India, forests and other wilderness areas; prevention and control of pollution; Indian Himalayan Environment and its sustainable development;afforestation, and land degradation mitigation. It is responsible for the administration of the 1947 national parks of India.

The Ministry of Environment, Forest and Climate Change is the cadre controlling authority of the Indian Forest Service (IFS), one of the three All India Services.

History
Environmental debates were  first introduced into the national political agenda during Indira Gandhi's first term as Prime Minister of India. The 4th Five-Year Plan (1969–74), for example, proclaimed "harmonious development [...] on the basis of a comprehensive appraisal of environmental issues." In 1977 (during the Emergency) Gandhi added Article 48A to the constitution stating that: "The State shall endeavour to protect and improve the environment and to safeguard the forests and wildlife of the country." The same decree transferred wildlife and forests from state list to concurrent list of the constitution, thus giving the central government the power to overrule state decisions on that matter. Such political and constitutional changes prepared the groundwork for the creation of a federal Department of Environment in 1980, turned into the Ministry of Environment and Forests in 1985.
Although tackling climate change was already a responsibility of the ministry, its priority was raised when in May 2014 the ministry was renamed to the current title of Ministry of Environment, Forest and Climate Change.

Administration
The forest administration is based on demarcation of states into Forest Divisions which consists of Forest Ranges. Forest Beats under Ranges are the smallest unit of administration hierarchy. Natural features on the field form the boundaries of each beat which has an average area of around 16 km square.

Organisation
Indian Forest Service (IFS)
Authorities
 Central Zoo Authority of India, New Delhi
 National Biodiversity Authority, Chennai
 National Tiger Conservation Authority, New Delhi
Subordinate offices
 Andaman & Nicobar Islands Forest and Plantation Development Corporation (Public Sector Undertaking)
 Animal Welfare Board of India, Chennai
 Botanical Survey of India (BSI), Kolkata
 Central Pollution Control Board
 Environmental Information System (ENVIS)
 Odisha State Pollution Control Board
 Delhi Pollution Control Committee
 Directorate of Forest Education
 Forest Survey of India
 Indira Gandhi National Forest Academy
 National Afforestation and Eco-Development Board
 National Board of Wildlife
 National Institute of Animal Welfare
 National Museum of Natural History (NMNH), New Delhi
 National Zoological Park (NZP), New Delhi
 Zoological Survey of India (ZSI), Kolkata
Centres of excellence
 Centre for Environment Education, Ahmedabad
 C. P. R. Environmental Education Centre, Chennai
 Centre for Animals and Environment, Bangalore
 Centre of Excellence in Environmental Economics, Chennai
 Foundation for Revitalisation of Local Health Traditions, Bangalore
 Centre for Ecological Sciences, Bangalore
 Centre for Environmental Management of Degraded Ecosystem, New Delhi
 Centre for Mining Environment, Dhanbad
 Sálim Ali Centre for Ornithology and Natural History (SACON), Coimbatore
 Tropical Botanic Garden and Research Institute, Thiruvananthapuram
Autonomous institutions
 G. B.Pant Institute of Himalayan Environment and Development, Almora
 Indian Institute of Forest Management, Bhopal
 Indian Plywood Industries Research and Training Institute, Bengaluru
 Indian Council of Forestry Research and Education (ICFRE), Dehradun
 Wildlife Institute of India (WII), Dehradun

Ministers

Initiatives
In August 2019 Ministry of Environment released the Draft National Resource Efficiency Policy. It is a set of guidelines which envisions a future with environmentally  sustainable and equitable economic growth. The policy is guided by principle of reduction in primary resource consumption; creation of higher value with less material through resource efficient circular approach; waste minimization; material security and creation of employment opportunities and business model beneficial to cause of environment protection and restoration. It was based on the report of NITI Aayog and European Union titled, The strategy on resource efficiency. The policy seeks to set up a National Resource Efficiency Authority with core working group housed in the Ministry. It also plans to offer tax benefits on recycled materials and soft loans to set up waste disposal and material recovery facilities.

As of 8th December 2021, some states have received more than Rupees 47,000 crore for afforestation. The states are directed to channel this amount as compensatory afforestation which shall be used for plantations, assisted natural forest regeneration, forest fire-prevention, pest and disease control in forest, and expedite soil and moisture conservation works.

References

External links
 
 Autonomous Organisations

 
Environment, Forests and Climate Change
Environmental agencies in India
Climate change in India
Forestry agencies in India
India
India
India
Ministries established in 1985
1985 establishments in India